The Wilder Brain Collection is a collection of human brains maintained by the Cornell University Department of Psychology. The collection was created by professor of anatomy, Burt Green Wilder. Wilder founded the Cornell Brain Society in 1889 to collect the brains of "educated and orderly persons". He believed that much could be learned about psychology from studying the anatomy of the brain. At its height, the collection contained over 600 and even as many as 1,200 brains and parts of brains.  By the 1970s the collection had been neglected and enthusiasm for brain collecting had dimmed. The university culled the collection to 122 specimens.

Part of the collection is on display in Uris Hall on the Cornell campus.  Brains on display include those of several notable individuals:

 Helen Hamilton Gardener, a suffragist who intended to prove the equality of the sexes through her contribution
 Edward H. Rulloff, a philologist and murderer who possessed one of the largest recorded brains
 Edward B. Titchener, a 19th and 20th century psychologist
 Henry Augustus Ward, naturalist
 Simon Henry Gage, naturalist, histologist, and microscopist
 Burt Green Wilder, Cornell professor of psychology and founder of the brain collection.  Wilder also served as a surgeon with the 55th Massachusetts Regiment during the American Civil War.
 Sutherland Simpson, Cornell professor of physiology

The collection also includes a piece of a pumpkin that was placed on the spire of McGraw Tower in 1997.

References 

 

Cornell University
Neuroscience research centers in the United States
Research institutes in New York (state)